David William Borthwick  (born 26 December 1950) is a former senior Australian public servant and policymaker.

Background and early life
Borthwick was the son of Bill Borthwick, former Liberal Deputy Premier of Victoria. Borthwick attended Monash University, gaining a Bachelor of Economics with First Class Honours.

Career
Borthwick moved to Canberra in 1973 to join the Australian Public Service as a graduate in the Department of the Treasury.

He was appointed Secretary of the Department of the Environment and Heritage in 2004, remaining the Environment Secretary through two departmental transitions, first to the Department of the Environment and Water Resources and later to the Department of the Environment, Water, Heritage and the Arts.

Borthwick retired from the public service in January 2009. He delivered his valedictory speech at the Australian War Memorial, telling his audience that public service agencies of the day were "so flat out, so stretched" they had "scant capacity to invest in serious thinking."

Awards
In June 2009 Borthwick was made an Officer of the Order of Australia for service to the development of environmental policy, particularly in relation to climate change, water allocation, emissions trading and heritage issues.

Borthwick had previously been awarded a Public Service Medal in June 2002.

Notes

References and further reading

1950 births
Living people
Australian public servants
Officers of the Order of Australia
Monash University alumni
Permanent Representatives of Australia to the Organisation for Economic Co-operation and Development
Recipients of the Public Service Medal (Australia)
People from Ferntree Gully, Victoria
Public servants from Melbourne